This is a list of the highest-paid athletes in the world as ranked by Forbes magazine.

2022 list 
The 2022 list:

2021 list 
The 2021 list:

2020 list 
The 2020 list:

2010–2019 list 
The 2010–2019 list:

2019 list
The 2019 list:

2018 list
The 2018 list:

2017 list
The 2017 list:

2016 list
The 2016 list:

2015 list
The 2015 list was released on 10 June 2015.

2014 list
The 2014 list was released on 11 June 2014.

2013 list

The 2013 list was released on 5 June 2013.

2012 list

The 2012 list was released on 18 June 2012.

See also 
 List of professional sports leagues by revenue

References

External links 
 The World's Highest-Paid Athletes List - Forbes

athletes
Lists of 21st-century people
Lists of people by magazine appearance
Highest-paid athletes
Income of sportspeople
Forbes list of athletes